Yachiyo Shoin Junior and Senior High School (八千代松陰中学校・高等学校) are private schools located in Yachiyo Chiba prefecture, Japan. Yachiyo Shoin Junior High School & Senior High School are coeducational schools.

About Yachiyo Shoin High School
In 1978, Hisata Yamaguchi established the school in Yachiyo city, Chiba prefecture. He was the professor and the dean of Tokai University School of Physical education. Then, he also opened Yachiyo Shoin Junior High School in 1982. Most of graduates of Yachiyo Shoin High School go on to Nihon University, Toyo University, Komazawa University and Senshu University.
Yachiyo shoin High School is one of top private high schools in Chiba, Japan.

Establishment
1978- Senior High School
1982- Junior High School

The founder
Hisata Yamaguchi

Courses
IGS Course
General Course

The deviation values
IGS Course:      69        most difficult
General Course:  64     very difficult

The number of students
2100 (Male: 1300, Female: 800)

Faculties
170

University choice of former students
2014

The University of Tokyo:      -     1
Kyoto University:                 -      0
Osaka University:                 -     1
Kyushu University:                -   0
Hokkaido University:              -  2
Nagoya University:                -   0
Tohoku University:                -   2
Chiba University:                  -  15
Niigata University:                -   2
Kanazawa University:               - 1
Nagasaki University:               - 1
Kumamoto University:               - 0
Okayama University:                - 0
Tsukuba University:                 -   5
Tokyo Metropolitan University:      -  5
Saitama University:                 -     5
Yokohama National University        -  4
Waseda University:                  -   15
Keio University:                    -  10
Sophia University:                  -  10
International Christian University  -  5
Tokyo University of Science:        -  10
Meiji University:                   -   30
Aoyama Gakuin University:           -   30
Rikkyo University:                  -   20
Chuo University:                    -  30
Hosei University:                   -  40
Gakushuin University:               -   15
Nihon University                    -  100
Toyo University                     -  50
Komazawa University                 -  50
Senshu University                   -  50

Notable alumni
Minako Tanaka (Actress)
Shota Oba (baseball)
Kazuhito Tadano (baseball)
Miho Asahi (Singer)
Kazuo Takahashi (Professional Wrestler)
Kazuyuki Fujita (Professional Wrestler)
Hiroto Katoh (Baseball)
Hiroyuki Suzuki (Composer)
Hirobumi Watarai (baseball)
Fumiko Ezaki (Olympic Silver Medalist, JUDO)
Gen Kaneko (Actor)
Kiyokazu Sugita (Comedian)
Takeshi Sasaki (Politician)
Hiroshi Matsumoto (Actor)
Yoshinobu Imamura (Comedian)
Saori Terakoshi (Track & Field)
Keikaku Itoh (S.F. Author)

External links
Yachiyo Shoin High School - http://www.yachiyoshoin.ac.jp/

Private schools in Japan
Education in Chiba Prefecture
Yachiyo, Chiba